Church of the Assumption, Booterstown is a Roman Catholic church located in Booterstown, County Dublin, Ireland. The church represents the Parish of the Assumption Booterstown, which was established in 1616. The present church opened in 1813 and was built as a replacement for the old chapel that existed at the site. The construction was paid for by Richard FitzWilliam, 7th Viscount FitzWilliam who provided it for his Catholic tenants.

History

Parish Boundary
The Booterstown parish was established in 1616 and its boundary was from Irishtown, through Donnybrook, Milltown, Churchtown, Rathfarnham to the top of Three Rock Mountain through Sandyford to Seapoint taking in Dundrum, Stillorgan and Galloping Green. Other parishes were formed directly or indirectly from the Booterstown parish such as Donnybrook in 1747, Dundrum in 1879, Blackrock in 1922, Mount Merrion in 1948, Merrion Road in 1964 and Newtownpark in 1967.

The Church
Construction of the present parish church started on 6 August 1812 with the laying of the foundation stone. The church was constructed at the expense of the Richard FitzWilliam, 7th Viscount FitzWilliam. He instructed the architect to make the church look like a house and avoid making it look like a church. This was to avoid upsetting his local Protestant tenants and friends. The church was dedicated to the Feast of the Assumption on 15 August 1813, by Dr. John Troy, Archbishop of Dublin.

Gallery

See also
Roman Catholic Archdiocese of Dublin

References

External links
Official Website
Archdiocese of Dublin
Newtownpark Website

Booterstown
Blackrock, Dublin
Churches of the Roman Catholic Archdiocese of Dublin
Churches in Dún Laoghaire–Rathdown
Catholic church buildings in County Dublin
Neoclassical church buildings in Ireland